Big Sucker Creek is an  river in St. Louis County, Minnesota, United States. It flows into Lake Superior.

See also
List of rivers of Minnesota

References

Minnesota Watersheds
USGS Hydrologic Unit Map - State of Minnesota (1974)

Rivers of Minnesota
Tributaries of Lake Superior
Rivers of St. Louis County, Minnesota